Kilsfjord Church is a parish church of the Church of Norway in the municipality of Volda in Møre og Romsdal county, Norway. It is located in the village of Straumshamn, at the southern end of the Kilsfjorden. It is the church for the Kilsfjord parish which is part of the Søre Sunnmøre prosti (deanery) in the Diocese of Møre. The concrete church was built in a rectangular "modern" design in 1974 using plans drawn up by the architect Alf Apalseth. The church seats about 200 people.

History
The church in Straumshamn was established in 1974 when the church was built. The concrete church was designed by Alf Apelseth. The church has a rectangular design meaning that the nave and chancel areas are both in the same room. The church has striking similarities to Nordsida Church in Stryn, which was designed by the same architect and was consecrated the year before. This church was consecrated on 28 April 1974.

See also 
List of churches in Møre

References

Volda
Churches in Møre og Romsdal
Rectangular churches in Norway
Concrete churches in Norway
20th-century Church of Norway church buildings
Churches completed in 1974
1974 establishments in Norway